Svyatogor may refer to:
Svyatogor - the name of a Russian mythical hero 
The following things were named after him:
Svyatogor (aircraft) - the name of a Russian airplane in the 1910s
Svyatogor - the name of the Soviet icebreaker Krasin until 1927